Anilios splendidus, also known as the splendid blind snake, is a species of blind snake that is endemic to Australia. The specific epithet splendidus means “splendid” or “magnificent”.

Description
The snake grows to an average of about 15 cm, and a maximum of 20 cm, in length. The upper body is dull grey, the belly white.

Behaviour
The species is oviparous.

Distribution
The species occurs at North West Cape in the Gascoyne region of Western Australia. The type locality is Milyering Well in the Cape Range National Park.

References

 
splendidus
Snakes of Australia
Reptiles of Western Australia
Reptiles described in 1998